Jampur (Urdu: ضلع جامپور) is a district of the Pakistani province of Punjab, with its administrative headquarters the city of Jampur. Lying west of the Indus River, its inhabitants are mostly Saraikis and Baloch.

Administration 

 Jampur Tehsil
 Muhammadpur Tehsil
 Dajal Tehsil

References 

Districts of Punjab, Pakistan